Charles Ludington may refer to:

 Charles Cameron Ludington, professor and specialist in the history of the wine industry
 Charles Townsend Ludington (1896–1968), businessman and socialite of Philadelphia